Scorpion and Felix, A Humoristic Novel is the only comedic fictional story to have been written by Karl Marx. Written in 1837 when he was 19 years old, it has remained unpublished. It was likely written under the influence of The Life and Opinions of Tristram Shandy, Gentleman by Laurence Sterne.

Description

The novel is told by a first-person narrator in the present tense.  The plot revolves around three main characters, Felix, Scorpion, and Merten, and their quest to uncover their origins.  The novel seems to take an ironic polemic with philosophy. It has also been described as satirical.

The surviving fragments of the book's manuscript have not been well regarded. Francis Wheen in his biography of Marx characterizes the work as "a nonsensical torrent of whimsy and persiflage" which was "dashed off in a fit of intoxicated whimsy," although he notes that a paragraph from that novel appears in a slightly changed form as a "famous opening paragraph" in The Eighteenth Brumaire of Louis Bonaparte.

Siegbert Salomon Prawer noted that the book is notable for being Marx's first attempt to discuss politics, and that it begins his polemic with Hegel. Anna Kornbluh, however, argued that the piece is a polemic with Locke, Fichte, and Kant, but not Hegel. She also commented more positively on the novel, concluding that it shows how even a young Marx "pursued logico-formal connections behind the veil of the visible, how thoroughly he tracked different forms of appearance of the real within ontologically positive reality".

The novel was never finished. Only some chapters of the novel survive to the modern day. Parts of the novel could have been burned by Marx himself, along with some other early works of his. The parts that survive are those fragments that Marx included as a supplement when he published his Book of Verse (1837).

The surviving fragments of Marx's novel were published in English for the first time in 1975 as part of Volume 1 of Marx-Engels Collected Works.

Footnotes

External links
Selection from the novel at Marxists Internet Archive

1837 novels
Books by Karl Marx
Unpublished novels
Unfinished novels
German comedy novels
19th-century German novels
German satirical novels
Literary duos
Male characters in literature
Comedy literature characters